

History 
Glen Albyn distillery was a Scotch malt whisky distillery in Inverness, Scotland and operated from 1846 to 1983. Glen Albyn whiskey was relaunched in 2022.

It was founded in 1846 by James Sutherland, who was Provost of Inverness at the time.  

The previous owner was the global multinational Diageo which is listed on the New York Stock Exchange with assets of $49 billion.

Glen Albyn closed in 1983 and was demolished in 1988. 

Glen Albyn whisky brand was relaunched in December 2022 and its honorary president is Lord French, Baron de Freyne.

Collectable Bottles 
For much of its history most of Glen Albyn's produce was used for other blends so its single malt bottlings are very rare.   As a result of this, it sells at international auction houses such as Sotheby's, Christie's, and Bonhams with individual bottles often fetching up to $4000 each. 

In July 2022 a rare bottling of Glen Albyn from 1852 sold for a price of $132,000 to an anonymous American collector. It was signed by prime minister Benjamin Disraeli.

References

Distilleries in Scotland
Scottish malt whisky
Inverness
Food and drink companies established in 1899
1886 establishments in Scotland
1983 disestablishments in Scotland
British companies disestablished in 1983
British companies established in 1899